Kumzar, is a village in Musandam, the northernmost province of Oman. It is the second most northerly inhabited part of the country, and the most northerly inhabited part on its mainland, located on the Strait of Hormuz. The village is only accessible by boat, and is so isolated that its inhabitants speak in their own language, known as Kumzari.

Etymology 
There are two main theories on the origin of the name. The first states that the name originates from the Arabic phrase kam zara hatha al-balada min bashar, which expresses exclamation at the large number of visitors to the village. The first two words of the phrase - kam zara - eventually became Kumzar.

The other theory is that the word Kumzar is a merge between the words kummah, a headdress, and izaar, a traditional loose garment for the lower body. However, this theory is discredited by the fact that the kummah is not traditionally worn in the village.

Geography 
Kumzar is located in the Musandam Governorate of Oman, and is the country's northernmost inland population center. It is located on the coastline, facing the Strait of Hormuz, and is situated between the inlets of a canyon.

Kumzar is an isolated village. With no road linking it to the nearest town of Khasab, it is only accessible by boat.

History 
Kumzar has been inhabited for approximately 500 years. although exact records are difficult. Early Portuguese maps of the area highlight a settlement in the area.

Demographics and culture 

The village has around 3000 inhabitants, and the majority of families have several children, with an average of 5-6 children per family.

Religion and language 
The Kumzari people practice the religion of Islam, but have a distinct culture from the Arabs in the rest of Oman.

The isolated location of the village has harboured a separate language, Kumzari. The language is a blend of 45 languages, including Arabic, Persian, English and Hindi.

Relationship with Khasab 
Most Kumzari families have two houses, one in Kumzar and the second in Khasab. The extreme heat in the summer makes Kumzar almost uninhabitable, so from May to September, most people leave Kumzar to stay in Khasab, where they also help the locals at Khasab harvest dates. 

In Khasab, the Kumzari are isolationist, living in their own separate district close to the sea.

References

Populated places in Oman
Musandam Governorate
Strait of Hormuz